There are many monuments and memorials in the Latvian capital Riga.

List of monuments and memorials

References

External links
 Monuments and sculptures in Riga
 Cultural Heritage of Riga